Gustav Mahler (1860–1911) was a Romantic composer.

Mahler may also refer to:
Mahler (surname), a surname (including a list of people with the surname)
Mahler (film), a 1974 film about Gustav Mahler
Mahler (horse), a racehorse
Mahler (crater), a crater on Mercury

See also

Maher (disambiguation)
Mahler measure
Mahler's compactness theorem
Mahler's theorem
Maler